The Guinean sea catfish (Carlarius parkii), also known as the marine catfish, is a species of sea catfish in the family Ariidae. It was described by Albert Günther in 1864, originally under the genus Arius. It is a tropical fish which is found in the eastern Atlantic off Mauritania, Angola, Morocco and Western Sahara. A single record was reported in the eastern Mediterranean Sea in 1986.

The Guinean sea catfish feeds on bony fish and shrimp. It is of commercial interest to fisheries, although a venom in the serrated spines of its dorsal and pectoral regions can cause painful injuries.

Male Guinean sea catfish orally incubate eggs.

References

Ariidae
Fish described in 1864
Taxa named by Albert Günther